Urney Glebe is a townland in County Tyrone, Northern Ireland. It is situated in the historic barony of Strabane Lower and the civil parish of Urney and covers an area of 124 acres.

The population of the townland declined during the 19th century:

The townland contains one Scheduled Historic Monument: an Ecclesiastical site and cross carved slab: Ernaidhe (grid ref: H3034 9491).

See also
List of townlands of County Tyrone
List of archaeological sites in County Tyrone

References

Townlands of County Tyrone
Archaeological sites in County Tyrone
Civil parish of Urney